The 1955 Women's European Volleyball Championship was the fourth edition of the event, organised by Europe's governing volleyball body, the Confédération Européenne de Volleyball. It was hosted in Bucharest, Romania from 15 to 24 June 1955.

Participating teams

Format
The tournament was played in a single round-robin format, with all teams placed in a single group.

Group and matches

|}

|}

Final ranking

References
 Confédération Européenne de Volleyball (CEV)

External links
 Results at todor66.com

European Volleyball Championships
Volleyball Championship
V
Women's European Volleyball Championships
June 1955 sports events in Europe
1950s in Bucharest
Women's volleyball in Romania
Sports competitions in Bucharest